The  Pennsylvania Historical and Museum Commission (PHMC) is the governmental agency of the Commonwealth of Pennsylvania responsible for the collection, conservation and interpretation of Pennsylvania's historic heritage. The commission cares for historical manuscripts, public records, and objects of historic interest; museums; archeology; publications; historic sites and properties; historic preservation; geographic names; and the promotion of public interest in Pennsylvania history.

PHMC was established June 6, 1945, by state Act No. 446, merging the Pennsylvania Historical Commission (PHC), Pennsylvania State Museum and Pennsylvania State Archives.

The commission is an independent administrative board, consisting of nine citizens of the Commonwealth appointed by the Governor; the Secretary of Education ex officio; two members of the Senate appointed by the President Pro Tempore and Minority Leader; and two members of the House of Representatives appointed by the Speaker and Minority Leader. As of March 2019, the chairman is Nancy Moses and the executive director is Andrea Lowery. PHMC Commissioners as of March 2019 are Ophelia M. Chambliss, Andrew E. Dinniman, Senator, William V. Lewis, Robert Matzie, Representative; Fredrick C. Powell, Pedro Rivera (ex officio, Secretary of Education), Robert M. Savakinus, Joseph B. Scarnati III, Senator, David Schuyler, Ph.D., Kenneth C. Turner, Parke Wentling, Representative; Philip D. Zimmermann.

PHMC Mission: 
The PHMC works in partnership with others to preserve the Commonwealth's natural and cultural heritage as a steward, teacher and advocate for the people of Pennsylvania and the nation.

PHMC Vision:  
The PHMC enriches people's lives by helping them to understand Pennsylvania's past, to appreciate the present, and to embrace the future.

Historical marker program

The PHMC administers the Historical Marker Program, which when it began in 1914, installed metal plaques onto large rocks and boulders to commemorate individuals, events, and landmarks throughout the state. The program was launched by the Pennsylvania Historical Commission, the predecessor to the PHMC. The markers were redesigned in 1945–46 to make them easier to read from a passing car. Large cast aluminum markers were mounted on poles along a street or road, close to where a landmark was located, a person lived or worked, or an event occurred. By 2020, more than 2,000 markers were in place and were being maintained by the PHMC. The PHMC has posted criteria for inclusion for new markers and accepts marker proposals from the public.

Pennsylvania Heritage
PHMC also publishes Pennsylvania Heritage magazine in conjunction with the Pennsylvania Heritage Foundation.

List of PHMC administered sites in Pennsylvania
Brandywine Battlefield
Cornwall Iron Furnace
Drake Well Museum
Eckley Miners' Village
Ephrata Cloister
Erie Maritime Museum
Landis Valley Museum
Old Economy Village
Pennsbury Manor
Pennsylvania Anthracite Heritage Museum
Pennsylvania Lumber Museum
Pennsylvania Military Museum
Pennsylvania State Archives
Railroad Museum of Pennsylvania
Scranton Iron Furnaces
The State Museum of Pennsylvania

Partnered Properties 

 Bushy Run Battlefield
Conrad Weiser Homestead
 Daniel Boone Homestead
 Fort Pitt Museum
 Graeme Park
 Hope Lodge 
 Joseph Priestley House
 Somerset Historical Center
 U.S. Brig Niagara

Placed Property Program 

 Curtin Village at Eagle Ironworks Historical Site
 French Azilum
 The Highlands
 Mather Mill
 Old Chester Court House
 Peace Church

Transferred: DCNR 

 Washington Crossing Historic Park

See also 
 History of Pennsylvania
 List of Pennsylvania state historical markers
 Western Pennsylvania Conservancy
 List of Pennsylvania state agencies

References

External links
 Trails of History

1945 establishments in Pennsylvania
Government agencies established in 1945
Pennsylvania state historical markers
State agencies of Pennsylvania
State history organizations of the United States